Coriarachne brunneipes is a species of crab spider in the family Thomisidae. It is found in the United States and Canada. It is commonly found living beneath tree bark. Females are known to guard their egg sac(s) until the spiderlings hatch.

References

Thomisidae
Spiders of North America
Spiders described in 1893
Taxa named by Nathan Banks
Articles created by Qbugbot